Li Bifeng (born 1965 in Shehong, Sichuan, China) is a Chinese activist, poet and Christian. He has been imprisoned since 1998.

Life and imprisonment 
The poet and campaigner for democracy, Li Bifeng, wrote a report in 1998 about a courageous sit-in of a group of textile workers on a Chinese highway. He passed the report to human rights organizations abroad. In 1989, he was arrested and sentenced for 12 years because of "economic crimes", after he had taken part in the 1989 Tiananmen Square protests and had been on the run for half a year.

In November 2012, 48-year-old Li was sentenced to another twelve years in prison with no plausible reason or evidence and despite worldwide protests. The authorities accused him of helping his friend Liao Yiwu, the writer and winner of the Peace Prize of the German Book Trade in 2012, when he fled to Germany.

On 4 June 2013, the international literature festival berlin held a worldwide reading for Li Bifeng.

See also 
 Protestantism in Sichuan

References 

Guardian: Chinese poet Li Bifeng jailed for 12 years
'In this country, we can only hibernate': Chinese poet Li Bifeng sentenced to 12 years imprisonment

1965 births
Living people
Sichuanese Protestants
Chinese dissidents